Louis de Deyster (1656 – 18 December 1711), also known as Lodewyk Deyster, was a Flemish artist and maker of musical instruments. His baroque paintings show a clear influence of Italian masters like Giordano, Maratta, Barocci and southern Dutch painters like Rubens, Van Dyck and Boekhorst. His daughter, Anne de Deyster, born in 1696, also became a painter and maker of musical instruments.

Biography
Deyster was born in 1656 in Bruges. He was a scholar of Jan Maes, a respectable artist of that city. From 1682 to 1688, he lived and worked in Italy, and when he returned to his native Bruges, he brought with him a flamboyant Roman Baroque style. He was of a deeply religious temper and his character was reflected in his choice of subjects.

He painted many pictures for the churches of his native city. His prints, all religious subjects, share with his paintings high drama and energy, with protagonists arranged in complex poses. Just as de Deyster applied his paint with freedom and spontaneity, so did he etch the plate. In the Church of St James at Bruges, there are three fine paintings by Deyster representing the Crucifixion, the Resurrection, and the death of the Virgin. In the Church of St Anne, also in Bruges, there is a work on the Martydom of St Sebastian.

References

Dictionary of Painters and Engravers, Biographical and Critical By Michael Bryan, pp. 209–210

External links
Works of Lodewyk Deyster at the Museum of New Zealand Te Papa Tongarewa
Recent Acquisitions at the New York Public Library

Artists from Bruges
17th-century Flemish painters
1656 births
1711 deaths
Businesspeople from Bruges